Ukrainian resistance may refer to:

 Revolutionary Insurgent Army of Ukraine
 Ukrainian resistance during World War II
 Ukrainian resistance during the 2022 Russian invasion of Ukraine